Paratiaia hulini is a species of beetle in the family Cerambycidae, the only species in the genus Paratiaia.

References

Cerambycini